Tartaglia may refer to:

Tartaglia (commedia dell'arte), Commedia dell'arte stock character
Angelo Tartaglia (1350 or 1370–1421), Italian condottiero
Niccolò Fontana Tartaglia (1499/1500–1557), Venetian mathematician and engineer
Ivo Tartaglia (1880–1949), Yugoslav politician
Marino Tartaglia (1894–1984), Croatian painter
Warren Tartaglia (Walid al-Taha) (born 1944), American jazz musician
Philip Tartaglia (1951–2021), Roman Catholic Archbishop of Glasgow, Scotland
Antonio Tartaglia (born 1968), Italian bobsledder
John Tartaglia (born 1978), American singer, actor, dancer and puppeteer
Tartaglia, a playable character in Genshin Impact